XX is a 2020 science fiction novel by writer Rian Hughes.

Design and publication

Hughes created a new typeface for the novel. Adapting the novel for e-readers was difficult, and Hughes considers the printed book to be the way the novel "should be read".

Reception
According to literary review aggregator Book Marks, the novel received mostly "Rave" reviews.

Neville Hawcock, writing for The Financial Times, praised the graphic elements of the book as an "enjoyable variation" from typical novels. Lydia Fletcher, in a review published by The Library Journal, criticized the novel as occasionally "difficult to follow" in part due to the "mixed-media" portions.

References

2020 British novels
The Overlook Press books
Graphic novels
2020 debut novels
2020 science fiction novels